Brook salamanders are a genus, Eurycea, of salamanders  native to North America.

Taxonomy 
The genus Eurycea was first described by Constantine Samuel Rafinesque-Schmaltz in 1822, with a specimen of the spotted-tail salamander, Eurycea lucifuga, from Kentucky. The taxonomy of the genus is somewhat confusing, as many of the species within it are poorly studied and are found only in very restricted ranges, or deep within caverns. Several species have even been described several times by different researchers, and some are often considered to be morphologically different enough to warrant being placed into their own genera.

A recent taxonomic revision moved the Georgia blind salamander to this genus, which makes Haideotriton a synonym of Eurycea.

Many sources also refer to several species of the genus as cave salamanders, due to their choice of habitat, or as blind salamanders, due to their reduced eyes, or the antiquated term for aquatic salamanders, Triton. Most species are from very isolated localities, so bear the name of the place the first specimen was found.

Species
This genus is composed of these 33 species:

Diet
Eurycea eat a variety of small arthropods such as spiders, Armadillidiidae, and insects. The food of larvae is at the same trophic level as the adults. E. cirrega, for example, eat isopods, chironomids, and copepods.

Reproduction
Mating can occur from fall to spring. Males use their premaxillary teeth to scratch the female during reproduction, most likely to release various pheromones.

References

External links
 . 2007. Amphibian Species of the World: an Online Reference. Version 5.2 (15 July 2008). Eurycea. Electronic Database accessible at http://research.amnh.org/herpetology/amphibia/index.php. American Museum of Natural History, New York, USA. (Accessed: July 31, 2008). 
  [web application]. 2008. Berkeley, California: Eurycea. AmphibiaWeb, available at http://amphibiaweb.org/. (Accessed: July 31, 2008).

 
Amphibian genera
Taxa named by Constantine Samuel Rafinesque